Poldavis (also called poledavis or poldavy) is a historical type of sailcloth originally manufactured in the town of Pouldavid on Baie de Douarnenez in Brittany.

Sailing equipment